Samuel Marx may refer to:

Samuel Marx (rabbi) (1775-1827), uncle of Karl Marx, rabbi of Trier.
Sam Marx born as Simon Marx (1859–1933), father of the Marx brothers
Samuel Marx (1902–1992) was an American film producer and writer.
Samuel Marx (New York politician) (1867–1922), American politician
Samuel Abraham Marx (1885–1964), American architect, designer and interior decorator